Anarchism in Algeria mainly concerns the history of the libertarian movement during and after French colonization in Algeria.

The colonial period
According to the French historian Gilbert Meynier: "The anticolonialist antecedents of French anarchism do not really make it possible to distinguish it, from the rest of the workers' movement in the colonies. It would be wrong to think that the anarchist tradition was quite anticolonialist. If activists claiming in any way the libertarian / anarchist current could have anti-colonialist positions, it was mainly through antimilitarism or defense, general and global, the oppressed."

As early as the end of the 19th century, numerous groups of political activists (emigrants or exiles of European origin) claimed to be anarchist. Despite their desire to promote anarchism to the entire population of Algeria, the anarchist movement was predominantly European. Article writers, as well as subscribers of the libertarian press, were in their vast majority Europeans from Algeria. It was not until the 1920s that activists of Algerian Arab and Berber origin joined the movement.

The libertarian press
The first anarchist newspaper, Revolutionary Action, was published in Algiers in 1887. Élisée Reclus participated in anarchist attempts in Algeria to try to found a local labor movement. At that time, some libertarians sympathized with emigrating to Africa for the purpose of "revolutionary propaganda". Over the decades numerous publications emerged printing a variety of anarchist viewpoints, including translations of Peter Kropotkin's works. By 1890, anarchist groups were publishing newspapers and holding public meetings in Algiers, Bab El Oued, Boufarik and Mustapha. These groups refused to send delegates to the Algerian Socialist Congress of 1901, instead standing for the creation of a revolutionary Committee with a single objective: "the Social Revolution".

In 1923, the "Libertarian Federation of North Africa" and its newspaper, Le Flambeau, was established by Algerian anarchists to coordinate Maghrebi libertarians in one and the same political organisation: "Le Flambeau has the ambition to unite all the anarchist comrades, scattered on all sides of our region, in the young and lively anarchist federation of northern French Africa and intensify anarchist propaganda more than ever".

References

Further reading
 
 
 

 
Anarchism
Algeria
Anarchism